Myanmar is participating at the 2011 Southeast Asian Games which are being held in the cities of Palembang and Jakarta, Indonesia from 11 November 2011 to 22 November 2011.

Medals

Medal table

Medals by date

Medalists

References

Nations at the 2011 Southeast Asian Games
2011 in Burmese sport
2011